Acronicta fallax, the green marvel, is a moth of the family Noctuidae. The species was first described by Gottlieb August Wilhelm Herrich-Schäffer in 1854. It is found in most of North America, from Ontario, Quebec, New Brunswick, Nova Scotia, Newfoundland and Labrador and Manitoba south to Arizona and Florida.

The wingspan is about 34 mm. Adults are on wing from February to November in Florida.

The larvae feed on Viburnum species. They feed on the leaf underside. Full-grown larvae are bright lime to yellowish green with a whitish middorsal and somewhat broader subdorsal stripe.

References

External links

Species info
Images
Bug Guide
Moths of Maryland

fallax
Moths of North America
Moths described in 1854